Gervais Emmanuel Ducasse (1903–1988) was a Haitian painter. Born in Port-au-Prince, Ducasse painted historical scenes.

References
 

1903 births
1988 deaths
20th-century Haitian painters
20th-century male artists
Haitian male painters